Sinsheim Museum/Arena station is a railway station in the municipality of Sinsheim, located in the Rhein-Neckar-Kreis in Baden-Württemberg, Germany.

History
On 28 May 1995, the Sinsheim Museum stop was put into operation. In 2011, the now double-track station became a part of Steinsfurt railway station and was renamed Sinsheim Museum/Arena.

Notable places nearby
Auto & Technik Museum Sinsheim
PreZero Arena

References

Railway stations in Baden-Württemberg
Buildings and structures in Rhein-Neckar-Kreis
Railway stations in Germany opened in 1995